Iranian Canadians or Persian Canadians are citizens of Canada whose national background is traced from Iran or are people possessing Iranian and Canadian dual citizenship. From the 2016 Canadian census, the main communities can be found in Southern Ontario, British Columbia, and Quebec. The vast majority, however, live in northern suburbs of Toronto such as Richmond Hill, Vaughan, Markham, and Thornhill, and in certain municipalities of Vancouver, including North Vancouver, West Vancouver, Burnaby, and Coquitlam.  a total of 97,110 Iranians reside in the Greater Toronto Area, 46,255 in the Greater Vancouver Area, and 23,410 in the Greater Montreal Area, with the remainder spread out in the other major cities of Canada, based on the 2016 Canadian Census. These numbers represent the people who stated "Iranian" as their single or joint ethnic origin in the census survey.

Terminology 
Iranian-Canadian is used interchangeably with Persian-Canadian, partly due to the fact that, in the Western world, Iran was known as "Persia". On the Nowruz of 1935, Reza Shah Pahlavi asked foreign delegates to use the term Iran, the endonym of the country used since the Sasanian Empire, in formal correspondence. Since then the use of the word "Iran" has become more common in the Western countries. This also changed the usage of the terms for Iranian nationality, and the common adjective for citizens of Iran changed from "Persian" to "Iranian". In 1959, the government of Mohammad Reza Pahlavi, Reza Shah Pahlavi's son, announced that both "Persia" and "Iran" could officially be used interchangeably. However the issue is still debated today. 

While the majority of Iranian-Canadians come from Persian backgrounds, there is a significant number of non-Persian Iranians such as Azeris and Kurds within the Iranian-Canadian community, leading some scholars to believe that the label "Iranian" is more inclusive, since the label "Persian" excludes non-Persian minorities.  The Collins English Dictionary uses a variety of similar and overlapping definitions for the terms "Persian" and "Iranian".

Demographics
In 2021, there were 213,160 individuals in Canada who had been born in Iran, of which 70,395 had immigrated to Canada since 2011. Among all Iranian-Canadians, 103,560 (49%) identified as Muslim. Among immigrants since 2011, about 39,860 (57%) identified as Muslim while most of the rest did not identify with any religion.

Notable Canadians of Iranian descent

Academia

Payam Akhavan, pioneer in international criminal law and leading human rights advocate; McGill University
 Kaveh Farrokh, historian
 Ramin Jahanbegloo, philosopher and university professor
 Ali Khademhosseini, Associate Professor of Medicine; Harvard-MIT Division of Health Sciences and Technology
 Shahrzad Mojab, Professor of Leadership, Higher and Adult Education; University of Toronto
Reza Zadeh, computer scientist; Stanford University

Art and literature 

 Hossein Amanat, architect, urban designer
 Reza Baraheni, novelist, poet, critic, and political activist
 Jian Ghomeshi, member of Moxy Früvous; former host of CBC's play; former host of Q on CBC Radio 1
 Siamak Hariri, architect
 Nazanine Hozar, writer
 Ramin Karimloo, West End performer, playing the lead role in Andrew Lloyd Webber's The Phantom of the Opera and the sequel Love Never Dies
 Navid Khonsari, video game, film and graphic novel creator, writer, director and producer
 Fariborz Lachini, music composer
 , painter, photographer and husband of ex-Olympic biathlete Myriam Bédard, convicted and sentenced in June 2007 for stealing paintings from the late painter Ghitta Caiserman
 Sanaz Mazinani, photographer and curator
 Kaveh Nabatian, musician and filmmaker
 Marina Nemat, author
 Ghazal Omid, nonfiction political writer, nonfiction children's book writer, speaker, NGO executive
 Fariborz Sahba, architect
 Bardia Sinaee, poet
 Parviz Tanavoli, sculptor and painter

Beauty pageants 
 Nazanin Afshin-Jam, Miss Canada 2003, first runner-up of Miss World 2003, actress, singer-songwriter, human rights activist; wife of former Canadian Defence Minister Peter MacKay
 Ramona Amiri, Miss World Canada 2005, semifinalist of Miss World 2005
 Samantha Tajik, Miss Universe Canada 2008

Business

 Ghermezian family, billionaire shopping mall developers
 Hassan Khosrowshahi, founder of Future Shop
 Karim Hakimi, founder of Hakim Optical
 Michael Latifi, founder of Sofina Foods Ltd and owner of Nidala (BVI) Limited which holds a share in the McLaren Group.
 Shahrzad Rafati, founder of BroadbandTV Corp
 Sam Mizrahi, real estate developer 
 Shahin Assayesh, publisher

Crime
 Omid Tahvili, kingpin and international fugitive

Entertainment
 Mehdi Sadaghdar, YouTube personality, electrical engineer

Journalism

Various Persian-language media (including TV and newspapers) are active in Canada, including Shahrvand and Salam Toronto, which cover local events as well.

 Maziar Bahari, journalist
 Farid Haerinejad, CBC former producer, documentary maker and current ِِEditor in Chief of Radio Zamaneh
 Zahra Kazemi, photojournalist
 Nikahang Kowsar, cartoonist
 Touka Neyestani, cartoonist

Politicians
 Ali Ehsassi, Federal Liberal MP for Willowdale, lawyer
 Majid Jowhari, Federal Liberal MP for Richmond Hill, engineer
 Amir Khadir, Québec solidaire Former MNA for Mercier, microbiologist
 Reza Moridi, Ontario Liberal Former MPP for Richmond Hill, physicist, engineer

Sport
 Nicholas Latifi, Formula One driver for Williams Grand Prix Engineering

Technology
 Behdad Esfahbod, programmer and creator of the HarfBuzz text shaping engine

Iranian districts in Canada

British Columbia
 North Vancouver
 West Vancouver
 Burnaby
 Coquitlam

Ontario
 Richmond Hill
 Vaughan
 Markham
 Thornhill

See also

 Azerbaijani Canadians
 Armenian Canadians
 Canadian Society of Iranian Engineers and Architects-Ottawa
 Iranian diaspora
 Iranian Americans
 Kurds in Canada
 Middle Eastern Canadians
 West Asian Canadians

References

External links
 PM meets with representatives of the Persian-Canadian community
 Iranians of Toronto website

Ethnic groups in Canada
 
Asian Canadian
 
 
West Asian Canadians